Faille is a type of cloth with flat ribs, often made in silk. It has a softer texture than grosgrain, with heavier and wider cords or ribs. Weft yarns are heavier than warp, and it is manufactured in plain weaving.  It was especially popular in the 19th century.

Material 
Faille was primarily made with silk, variations with cotton and wool were also there.  A French silk variant was called ''Faille Francaise.'' The similar grosgrain has been described as a "firm, stiff, closely woven, corded fabric. The cords are heavier and closer than those in poplin, more round than those in faille."

Use 
Faille was a fabric with lower luster, better drape and feel in comparison to counterparts like Grosgrain. It was used in ladies' dresses, suits and spring coats.

See also 
 Moire (fabric)

References 

Woven fabrics